One male athlete from Panama competed at the 1996 Summer Paralympics in Atlanta, United States and won two gold medals for his country.

Medallists

See also
Panama at the Paralympics
Panama at the 1996 Summer Olympics

References 

Nations at the 1996 Summer Paralympics
1996
Summer Paralympics